Mellor is a village situated in the Borough of Ribble Valley in Lancashire, England. The population of the civil parish at the census of 2011 was 2,262.

It is reasonably large in size for a village, with two churches, one Church of England Parish Church (St Mary's) and one Methodist, as well as a primary school, three public houses and a hotel. In addition to this there is a post office and general store, a hair salon and a beauty salon, a high quality butcher's shop, a pharmacy and a private hire company. There are also three disused quarries, and the remains of an eel farm, that was destroyed by fire in the 1990s.

Stanley House is a 16th Century building which is listed on the English Heritage Register. It is now a hotel and spa.

Atop the highest hill on Mellor Moor, overlooking the village, is the site of a Roman signalling station, and a now disused Royal Observer Corps Nuclear Blast and Fallout Monitoring Station. The monitoring post was opened in July 1959, was decommissioned in October 1968, and is situated on a low mound ten yards west of a trig point overlooking BAE Samlesbury Airfield.

Many people still believe that this was a nuclear shelter or an air raid shelter for the use of the local population during times of war. A millennium viewpoint pillar has been erected alongside encroaching onto the top of the post. Mellor has a village hall, situated near the centre of the village. It hosts many activities such as football, tennis, bowls and hockey.

The hall is also used for other activities such as line dancing, disco parties and exercise classes. The hall is available for hire. The hall also functions as the community centre for the village, where residents can go to discuss  how to improve the local area.

Close to the village hall is a playing field and a tennis court, which proves very popular in the summer. In the centre of the village, there is a playground adjacent to a small public library, and a doctor's surgery, which share the same building. The local populace is generally middle class and middle aged, although the tranquil rolling hills and tight sense of community have made it a prime retirement location.

Mellor is linked to Mellor Brook, another small village, which features a bakery, post office with general store, an art gallery and the Feildens Arms, a public house. The hub of Mellor Brook is the Community Centre, which was originally a chapel before becoming a primary school, which closed in 1962.

In 1966, the building became a Community Centre, having been bought from the church, to be maintained as a Registered Charity until this day.

See also

Listed buildings in Mellor, Lancashire

References

External links 

St Mary the Virgin Parish Church
Feildens Arms Public House
Mellor Village Hall
Mellor Brook Community Centre
Mellor St Mary's CE Primary School league table results (2006)
The Carrier Pigeon Magazine Community magazine

Villages in Lancashire
Civil parishes in Lancashire
Geography of Ribble Valley